Momordica dioica, commonly known as spiny gourd or spine gourd and also known as bristly balsam pear, is a species of flowering plant in the Cucurbitaceae/gourd family. It is used as a vegetable in all regions of India and some parts in South Asia. It has commercial importance and is exported and used locally. The fruits are cooked with spices, or fried and sometimes eaten with meat or fish. It is propagated by underground tubers. It has small leaves, small yellow flowers, it has small, dark green, round or oval fruits. It is dioecious, which means that it has distinct male and female individual organisms, hence its name.

Uses

Momordica dioica is used as a vegetable in all regions of India and some parts in South Asia. It has commercial importance and is exported and used locally. The fruits are cooked with spices, or fried and sometimes eaten with meat or fish.

References

External links
Momordica dioica Farming Details

dioica
Dioecious plants
Fruit vegetables